Johan Fredrik Eykman or Johann Frederik Eijkman (19 January 1851 – 7 January 1915) was a Dutch chemist.

Family background 
He is one of the eight children of Christiaan Eijkman, the headmaster of a local school, and Johanna Alida Pool. His brother Christiaan Eijkman (1858–1930) was a physician and professor of physiology whose demonstration that beriberi is caused by poor diet led to the discovery of vitamins. Together with Sir Frederick Hopkins, his brother received the Nobel Prize for Physiology or Medicine.

Life in Japan 
He was hired during the Meiji period, a Japanese era which extended from September 1868 through July 1912. During his stay in Japan, he was the first to isolate shikimic acid in 1885  from the Japanese flower shikimi (シキミ, the Japanese star anise, Illicium anisatum).

Works 

 1883 : "Phytochemische Notizen ueber einige Japanische Pflanzen"

References 

 Notice sur la vie et l'oeuvre scientifique Johan Frederik Eykman. Recueil des Travaux Chimiques des Pays-Bas et de la Belgique, 1916, Volume 35, Issue 11-12, pages 365–411, 
 Johan Frederik Eykman—A physical chemist. van Klooster H. S., Journal of Chemical Education, volume 28, issue 12, page 616,

External links 

1851 births
1915 deaths
20th-century Dutch chemists
People from Nijkerk
Academic staff of the University of Amsterdam
Academic staff of the University of Tokyo
19th-century Dutch chemists